The Chapel may refer to:
One of these non-denominational churches:
The one located in Akron and Green, Ohio.
The Chapel located in Chicago.
The Chapel located in Fort Wayne, Indiana.
A recording studio in Lincolnshire, England.
The Chapel (San Francisco), a music venue